Monte Cara is a mountain in western part of the island of São Vicente, Cape Verde. Its elevation is 490 m. It resembles a human face looking at the sky, hence its name, which means "face mountain". It is a landmark of the city of Mindelo, from which it can be seen across Porto Grande Bay.

The album Voz d'Amor (2003) by Cesária Évora contains the song Monte Cara.

See also
 List of mountains in Cape Verde

References

Cara
Geography of São Vicente, Cape Verde